Luvnith Sisodia (born 15 January 2000) is an Indian cricketer. He made his Twenty20 debut for Karnataka in the 2018–19 Syed Mushtaq Ali Trophy on 25 February 2019. In February 2022, he was bought by the Royal Challengers Bangalore in the auction for the 2022 Indian Premier League tournament.

References

External links
 

2000 births
Living people
Indian cricketers
Karnataka cricketers
Place of birth missing (living people)